John Cleese is an English actor, comedian, producer, screenwriter and writer. He is known for his work on screen and stage. He was a member of the comedy sketch group Monty Python. This is a filmography of his work which consists of about 180 various roles.

Film

Television

Theatre

Video games

Radio credits

Audiobooks 
(list only includes audiobooks in which Cleese is sole reader, not those in which he is part of a cast)

Television advertisements

Notes

References

External links 

 
 
 John Cleese at the BBC Guide to Comedy
 
 
 
 
 
 Podcast to celebrate The Life of Brian (March 2008)
 Daily Llama: John Cleese Visits Lemurs at San Francisco Zoo
 John Cleese Speaking at the American School in London
 A Conversation with John Cleese at Cornell University (September 2017)

British filmographies
Male actor filmographies